Cherub, stylized as CHERUB, is an electro-indie duo from Nashville, Tennessee formed in 2010 consisting of Jordan Kelley and Jason Huber.

Music career 

Jordan Kelley and Jason Huber met at Nashville's water park Nashville Shores whilst riding boogie boards in the wave pool.  Kelley and Huber both attended Middle Tennessee State University and studied music tech. Jordan Kelley is originally from Buffalo NY. Jason Huber is originally from New Jersey. They were friends for five years before  starting CHERUB. Since its inception, the band has played iconic venues across the country, such as Red Rocks Amphitheater in Morrison, CO and Ryman Auditorium in Nashville, TN. The duo uses Reason, Pro Tools, and Ableton software to produce their music.

In February 2014, their single "Doses & Mimosas" charted at number 43 on Billboards Rock Airplay chart and at number 23 on the Alternative Songs chart.  "Doses & Mimosas" also topped The Hype Machine chart and has more than 47 million YouTube views.
The duo's debut album, Year of the Caprese, was released on May 27 on Columbia Records.

On October 14, 2016, the duo released their second studio album, "Bleed Gold, Piss Excellence." They followed it up with a 50-date tour across North America, called the "Bleed Gold" tour.

In February 2017, Cherub embarked on a two-month co-headline tour, called "Your Girlfriend Already Bought Tickets Tour," with the band The Floozies.

After an almost two-year hiatus, the duo returned in 2018 with four new singles: "All In," "Dancing Shoes," "Body Language," and "Want That." They performed and promoted their new releases across the United States on the Free Form Tour in 2018.

Discography

Studio albums

Extended plays

Singles

Guest appearances

References

External links 
 

American musical duos
American synth-pop groups
Columbia Records artists
Musicians from Nashville, Tennessee